Hryhoriy Oleksiyovych Illyashov (Ukrainian: Григорій Олексійович Ілляшов; born April 13, 1965) is a former KGB operative, Ukrainian spy, and politician. He made a career in the Security Service of Ukraine. Illyashov is a husband of former Minister of Justice of Ukraine Olena Lukash.

In 2010 he was appointed the head of the Foreign Intelligence Service of Ukraine.

References

1965 births
Living people
People from Svatove
Party of Regions politicians
Fifth convocation members of the Verkhovna Rada
Sixth convocation members of the Verkhovna Rada
Colonel Generals of Ukraine
Ukrainian spies
People of the Foreign Intelligence Service of Ukraine
Security Service of Ukraine officers
KGB officers